Bagh Safa (also Romanized as Bāgh Şafā; also known as Bāgh-e Seyāh, Bāgh-e Sīāh, and Bāgh Seyāh) is a village in Bagh Safa Rural District, Sarchehan District, Bavanat County, Fars Province, Iran. At the 2006 census, its population was 864, in 211 families.

References 

Populated places in Sarchehan County